is a Japanese professional baseball player for the Tokyo Yakult Swallows of Nippon Professional Baseball (NPB). He has played in Nippon Professional Baseball (NPB) for the Yokohama BayStars and Fukuoka SoftBank Hawks.

Career

Yokohama BayStars

On March 30, 2001, Uchikawa made his NPB debut.

He rose to prominence in 2008 with a league-leading .378 batting average.

Fukuoka SoftBank Hawks
During the 2010 offseason, he exercised his free agent option and after weeks of negotiations between the Yokohama BayStars, Hiroshima Toyo Carp, and Fukuoka SoftBank Hawks, he decided to sign a four-year deal with SoftBank worth up to 1.36 billion yen.

On December 2, 2020, he became a free agent.

Tokyo Yakult Swallows
On December 11, 2020, Uchikawa signed with Tokyo Yakult Swallows of NPB and held press conference.

International career
He was selected for the Japanese national baseball team in the 2009 World Baseball Classic, 2013 World Baseball Classic and 2017 World Baseball Classic.

References

External links

1982 births
Living people
Fukuoka SoftBank Hawks players
Japanese baseball players
National baseball team players
Nippon Professional Baseball infielders
Nippon Professional Baseball MVP Award winners
Nippon Professional Baseball outfielders
People from Ōita (city)
Tokyo Yakult Swallows players
Yokohama BayStars players
2009 World Baseball Classic players
2013 World Baseball Classic players
2017 World Baseball Classic players